The  is a Gymnasium in Schweinfurt, Bavaria, Germany.

The eponym is Alexander von Humboldt (1769–1859). The school has approximately 100 teachers and 1,200 students.

External links 
 Official website of 

Schools in Bavaria

Gymnasiums in Germany
Educational institutions established in 1833
Schweinfurt
1833 establishments in Bavaria